The  Uttarakhand State Election Commission is an autonomous, independent, constitutional and statutory authority of the Indian state of Uttarakhand. It was formed on 30 July 2001 under the Constitution of India through the provisions of the 73rd and 74th Amendments Act of 1992.

List of State Election Commissioners
The following have held the post of the State Election Commissioner of Uttarakhand.

Elections 
As of 2019 the thirteen districts in Uttarakhand had conducted six general elections.

Municipalities 

 Municipal Corporations
 Municipal Councils
 Nagar Panchayats

Panchayats 

 District Councils (Zila Panchayats)
 Block Development Councils (Block Panchayats)
 Gram Panchayats

See also 
 Election Commission of India
 Local government in India
 Elections in Uttarakhand
 Local elections in Uttarakhand

References

External links 
 

State agencies of Uttarakhand
2001 establishments in Uttarakhand
State Election Commissioners of India
Local elections in Uttarakhand
Government agencies established in 2001